Soviet submarine K-51 was a K-class submarine of the Soviet Navy during World War II operating with the Baltic Fleet.

Operational history 
Entered in service after the German invasion, she saw active service late during the war, attacking mostly fishing vessels.

References 

1939 ships
Ships built in the Soviet Union
Soviet K-class submarines
World War II submarines of the Soviet Union